Dula Gavabar (also Romanized as Dūlā Gavābar; also known as Dolā Gavābar and Dūlā Gāvbar) is a village in Rahimabad Rural District, Rahimabad District, Rudsar County, Gilan Province, Iran. At the 2006 census, its population was 95, in 24 families.

References 

Populated places in Rudsar County